The Men's 4 × 200 metre freestyle relay competition of the 2021 FINA World Swimming Championships (25 m) was held on 19 December 2021.

Records
Prior to the competition, the existing world and championship records were as follows.

Results

Heats
The heats were started at 11:03.

Final
The final was held at 19:58.

References

Men's 4 x 200 metre freestyle relay